Michael Thomas Walter Arnheim (also known as "Doctor Mike"; born 24 March 1944) is a practising London barrister and author. He has written twenty-two published books to date, including most recently the philosophical work, The God Book, and political works, Two Models of Government and Anglo-American Law: A Comparison. Previously published books include The Handbook of Human Rights Law, Principles of the Common Law, The U.S. Constitution for Dummies (part of Wiley's For Dummies series), and The Problem with Human Rights Law.

Early life and education
Michael Arnheim was born in Johannesburg, South Africa, to a secular orthodox Jewish family. His father, Dr Wilhelm Arnheim, who had come to South Africa from Germany in 1933, was a medical doctor and a polymath with a dry sense of humor. His mother, Victoria ("Vicky", née Shames) was a music teacher and an active member of the Council of Johannesburg's Great Synagogue. She was born in South Africa of Lithuanian-born parents, her father, Wolf Shames, being a noted rabbinical scholar. Michael Arnheim was particularly close to his paternal grandmother, Martha Arnheim (née Bernhardt, always called "Oma"), from whom he learnt German and by whom he was entertained with her amusing tales of life in Baerwalde, Pomerania, in pre-World War I Germany. Oma's husband (Michael Arnheim's grandfather), Max Arnheim, a prosperous barrel manufacturer, served in the German army in World War I, and Oma's father, Julius Bernhardt, fought proudly on the Prussian side in the Danish- Prussian War of 1864, the Austro-Prussian War of 1866 and the Franco-Prussian War of 1870.

As a 14-year-old student at King Edward VII School in Johannesburg, Arnheim was picked to join the "Quiz Kids" team of five capped and gowned teenagers, appearing on South Africa's Springbok Radio, and of which he became a stalwart member, "retiring" at the age of eighteen. He entered Johannesburg's University of the Witwatersrand at the age of 16, he took a first-class B.A. in History and Classics at the age of 19, first-class Honours at 20 and an M.A. with distinction at the age of 21.

He then went up to St John's College, Cambridge, on a National Scholarship (later converted to a St John's College scholarship supplemented by a Strathcona Travel Exhibition). Besides his academic pursuits (including teaching numerous undergraduates) he engaged in student politics, being elected a member of the Junior Combination Room committee and College NUS secretary, in which capacity he represented the College at several national conferences, including one in 1968 at which he proposed a widely supported motion to the effect that the English A-Level system was unduly narrow and should be broadened. He captained the College's University Challenge team, which displayed a hedgehog as its mascot by way of a gentle ribbing of the then Master of St John's, John Boys Smith, who had just published a paper on the subject. Arnheim had as his Ph.D. supervisor  A.H.M. ("Hugo") Jones, then Cambridge Professor of Ancient History, and John Crook as his college mentor, who was to occupy the position of Professor of Ancient History later on.

Career
In 1969, at the age of 25, Arnheim was awarded his Cambridge Ph.D. His doctoral dissertation was subsequently published by the Oxford University Press under the title The Senatorial Aristocracy in the Later Roman Empire. In the meantime Arnheim was elected a Fellow of St John's College, Cambridge, where he did a great deal of teaching for a number of colleges while researching his next book, Aristocracy in Greek Society (1977), which he was invited by Professor Howard Hayes Scullard to write as part of the prestigious Thames & Hudson series, Aspects of Greek and Roman Life.

At the age of 31 Arnheim was invited to take up the position of full Professor and Head of the Department of Classics back at his old university in South Africa. During this time he devised a new system of learning Latin, which he would later integrate into a new approach to the learning of European languages in general. In 1979 he published South Africa after Vorster, which predicted that the alternative to White rule was not a shared-power democracy between Blacks and Whites, as White liberals argued, but rule by a Black oligarchy at the expense of Whites and ordinary Blacks alike.

Arnheim's next book. Is Christianity True? (1984), caused quite a stir and was translated into several languages, including Spanish. Through a close re-examination of the historical evidence the book asserted that most Christian beliefs about Jesus were untrue. One review wrote:

Despite this, Arnheim was invited to address Professor Henry Chadwick's Patristics seminar in the Cambridge Divinity School.

Despondent about the future of South Africa, Arnheim returned to Britain, where he was called to the Bar by Lincoln's Inn in 1988, and went into practice as a London barrister specializing in civil litigation, with a certain amount of criminal defence on the side, notably the Cardiff Prison Riot trial in 1992. Arnheim, in 1992, was an early voice in the legal profession to adamantly insist that a person could face criminal liability for knowingly concealing their HIV-positive status from a sexual partner. His civil law practice has been largely in the field of commercial litigation including some international litigation as of counsel to Brown & Welsh P.C. of Meriden, Connecticut.

From early on in his practice at the Bar, Arnheim wrote articles in favor of clients' being allowed to come direct to a barrister, thus avoiding the additional expense of having to be referred by a solicitor. His pleas fell on deaf ears until the idea was taken up in a hard-hitting report by the Director of Fair Trading, Sir John Vickers, published in 2000. Arnheim was one of the first barristers to register for direct public access when this was eventually allowed in 2004. Arnheim has also written extensively on other legal topics, ranging from court procedure to the common law, constitutional law, judicial power and human rights.

Ideas

Arnheim is known for his ideas in several fields, notably religion, history, politics, and law.

Religion
The God Book (2015), a sequel to Is Christianity True? (1984), is a thoroughgoing critique of atheism and conventional religion alike. The book argues that atheism and conventional religion are both deficient in credibility as well as in toleration. Arnheim prefers Deism, or the belief in an impersonal God who does not get involved in the day-to-day affairs of the world.

Arnheim additionally authored an article entitled "God Without Religion" for publication in Pandeism: An Anthology (2017).

History & Politics
Arnheim's Cambridge Ph.D. thesis, published by the Oxford University Press in 1972 under the title The Senatorial Aristocracy in the Later Roman Empire, offered a new explanation of the "decline and fall" of the Roman Empire in the West. Arnheim contended that the reason the Western Empire fell was that the central government in the West was sapped from within by the senatorial aristocracy, who now again dominated the top administrative posts while building up their own countervailing local power through the spread of large estates. As a result, the central government proved unable to withstand the "barbarian" incursions. The same rise of the senatorial aristocracy did not occur in the Eastern half of the Empire, which therefore survived for another thousand years, albeit in a gradually shrinking state.

This analysis itself was based on a new theory about the essential nature of governmental power, namely that there are and have ever been essentially only two models of government: (a) where power is concentrated in the hands of a minority, whether hereditary or not; and (b) where power is concentrated in the hands of a single individual. This analysis was also the subject of Aristocracy in Greek Society (1977). The same model was then tested and found to apply to modern history and the present-day world as well. This is the theme of Two Models of Government, published in 2016.

Law

In 1994 Arnheim was invited to edit a volume of essays on the Common Law in the prestigious Dartmouth series, and published in the US by New York University Press. This book was followed up by Principles of the Common Law (2004), which sought to restate some basic principles of the Common Law that had been lost sight of in recent years.

Arnheim was invited by Butterworths to write a book on the drafting of settlement agreements: Drafting Settlements of Disputes: A Guide for Litigators (1994). In 2000 he was asked by Butterworths to write (together with District Judge Christopher Tromans) a guide to the new procedural rules that had just been introduced: Civil Courts Practice and Procedure Handbook.

The Handbook of Human Rights Law, published by Kogan Page in 2004, provided a whole new take on the subject focusing particularly on the way human rights law had been hijacked by special interest groups made up notably of illegal immigrants, asylum seekers, terrorist suspects and even convicted killers. This theme was picked up in the booklet written at the invitation of the Civitas thinktank titled The Problem with Human Rights Law (2015), in which it was argued that the unduly "politically correct" tenor of human rights court decisions in the United Kingdom were largely the fault not of the European Court of Human Rights, as the British Government believed, but of the domestic judiciary. Judicial supremacism has been a recurrent theme of many of Arnheim's articles, notably the article titled "Five Centuries of Legal Thinking" that he was invited by St John's College, Cambridge, to write on the 500th anniversary of the foundation of the College. Judicial supremacism also figures quite prominently in Two Models of Government.

Arnheim was delighted to be asked to write the U.S. Constitution for Dummies (2009) as part of the well-known Wileys series of books with their distinctive black-and-yellow covers. To accommodate Arnheim's own opinions the publishers created two new icons, one for "In my Opinion" and the other for "Controversy". The Foreword for the first edition was written by Senator Ted Cruz. The Foreword is omitted from the second edition.

Bibliography

Books
 History of St John's College, Cambridge, St John's College, 1968
 The Senatorial Aristocracy in the Later Roman Empire, Oxford University Press, 1972.
 The Study of a Civilization, Witwatersrand University Press, 1976.
 The Adventures of Marcus, University of the Witwatersand, 1976 
 Aristocracy in Greek Society (Aspects of Greek and Roman Life), Thames & Hudson, 1977.
 South Africa after Vorster, Howard Timmins, 1979.
 Is Christianity True? Gerald Duckworth, 1984.
 Arnheim's Answer: Secret of Student Success, Elliot Right Way Books, 1986. 
 Drafting Settlements of Disputes, Tolley, 1994.
 The Common Law (International Library of Essays in Law and Legal Theory), Dartmouth, 1994.
 Civil Courts Practice and Procedure Handbook (with District Judge Christopher Tromans), Butterworth, 1999.
 Principles of the Common Law, Gerald Duckworth, 2004.
 The Handbook of Human Rights Law, Kogan Page, 2004.
 U.S. Constitution for Dummies, John Wiley, 2009; 2nd edition 2018.
 The God Book, Imprint Academic, 2015.
 The Problem with Human Rights Law, Civitas, 2015.
 Two Models of Government: A New Classification in Terms of Power, Societas, Imprint Academic, 2016.
 "God Without Religion," in Pandeism: An Anthology, 2017.
 God Without Religion: An Alternative View of Life, the Universe & Everything, Black House Publishing, 2016.
 A Practical Guide to Your Human Rights and Civil Liberties ("Straightforward Guide to" series), Straightforward Publishing, 2017. 
 U.S. Constitution for Dummies, 2nd edition, John Wiley & Sons, 2018.
 Anglo-American Law: A Comparison, The Lawbook Exchange (Talbot Publishing), 2019.

Other writings
Journal articles
"A conspiracy too far?" New Law Journal (August 17, 2018)
"Lord Neuberger's salutary warning", New Law Journal (November 9, 2018)
"The gay wedding cake saga", New Law Journal (December 7, 2018)
"Monarchs, judges & controversial Prime Ministers", New Law Journal (October 3, 2019)
"Don't blame the judges", New Law Journal (January 24, 2020)

Blogs
Huffington Post page for Dr Arnheim
"My Challenge to Richard Dawkins and Jonathan Sacks: Why Both Atheists And Religious People Are Wrong", Huffington Post, Posted: 20/10/2015 17:36 BST Updated: 20/10/2015 17:59 BST
"Niall Ferguson's Droll Parallel Between the Paris Terrorist Attack and the Fall of Rome", Huffington Post (November 26, 2015)
"The Brexit Referendum - Joke Letter From 1,054 Barristers",  Huffington Post (July 12, 2016)

References

External links
 Website: http://www.doctormike.co.uk

1944 births
Living people
British barristers
Legal writers
Religious writers
Alumni of King Edward VII School (Johannesburg)
University of the Witwatersrand alumni
People from Johannesburg
Alumni of St John's College, Cambridge
Contestants on British game shows
South African emigrants to the United Kingdom
South African people of German-Jewish descent
South African people of Lithuanian-Jewish descent